Tafí del Valle Department is a department in Tucumán Province, Argentina. It has a population of 13,883 (2001) and an area of 2,741 km². The seat of the department is in Tafí del Valle.

Municipalities and communes
Amaicha del Valle
Colalao del Valle
El Mollar
Tafí del Valle

Notes
This article includes content from the Spanish Wikipedia article Departamento Tafí del Valle.

Departments of Tucumán Province